The Mayville Historic District is a  historic district in Mayville, North Dakota.  It includes works of significance during 1889–1930.  It includes Late 19th and Early 20th Century American Movements, Late 19th and 20th Century Revivals, and Late Victorian architecture. It was listed on the National Register of Historic Places in 1985. The listing included 30 contributing buildings and two other contributing structures.

It includes both campus buildings of the Mayville State College and an adjacent residential district. Both the Robinson House and the Stomner House are individually listed contributing properties.

References

Victorian architecture in North Dakota
Historic districts on the National Register of Historic Places in North Dakota
National Register of Historic Places in Traill County, North Dakota
Buildings and structures completed in 1889
Neighborhoods in North Dakota
University and college campuses in North Dakota
University and college buildings on the National Register of Historic Places in North Dakota
1889 establishments in North Dakota
Residential buildings on the National Register of Historic Places in North Dakota
Mayville State University
Mayville, North Dakota